Guarea juglandiformis is a species of plant in the family Meliaceae. It is found in Brazil and Peru.

References

juglandiformis
Vulnerable plants
Taxonomy articles created by Polbot